Espandī ‘Olya, sometimes transliterated as Espandi, Esphan Deh, Ispandi, Spandeh, Spendi Ulya, and variations thereof, is a village in Ghazni Province, in eastern Afghanistan.

See also 
 Ghazni Province

References 

Populated places in Ghazni Province